Lasiopetalum ferrugineum, commonly known as rusty velvet-bush, is a species of flowering plant in the mallow family and is endemic to eastern Australia. Growing up to a metre tall, much of the plant is covered in rusty hairs. It is found in forest and heathland.

Description
The upper surface of the leaves is more or less glabrous and the lower surface covered with woolly, white to rust-coloured hairs. There are prominent veins on both surfaces of the leaves. The flowers are arranged in crowded cymes of five to ten, more or less sessile flowers.

Taxonomy
Lasiopetalum ferrugineum was first formally described by Henry Cranke Andrews in his 1802 work The Botanist's Repository for New, and Rare Plants, from an unpublished description by James Edward Smith. The description was based on a plant grown in 1796, in the Vineyard Nursery of Lee and Kennedy in Hammersmith, London, from seeds collected near Port Jackson. Its species name is derived from the Latin, meaning "rust-coloured".

Two varieties are recognised by the Australian Plant Census: 

Distribution and habitat
Rusty velvet-bush is found in sclerophyll forest and heathland and occurs from south-east Queensland through eastern New South Wales and into far-eastern Victoria. It is often a spreading shrub in more expose areas and taller in sheltered areas and gullies. It prefers sandy soils.

Use in horticulture
The flushes of rust-coloured new growth of this species have some ornamental appeal. It grows fairly readily in part-shade in the garden, and is propagated by seed or cutting.

References

Malvales of Australia
Flora of New South Wales
Flora of Queensland
Flora of Victoria (Australia)
Plants described in 1802
ferrugineum
Taxa named by Henry Cranke Andrews